The 2014–15 Tulsa Golden Hurricane women's basketball team will represent the University of Tulsa during the 2014–15 NCAA Division I women's basketball season. The season marks the first for the Golden Hurricane as members of the American Athletic Conference. The team, coached by head coach Matilda Mossman in her fourth year, plays their home games at the Reynolds Center. They finished the season 18–14, 12–6 in AAC play to finish in a tie for third place. They lost in quarterfinals of the American Athletic women's tournament to Tulane. They were invited to the Women's National Invitation Tournament where defeated Missouri State in the first round before losing to Eastern Michigan in the second round.

Media
All Golden Hurricane games will be broadcast on KTGX CHROME 95.3 FM and KWTU 88.7 FM HD3. The audio broadcast can also be heard on Hurricane Vision. A video stream for all home games will be on Hurricane Vision, ESPN3, or AAC Digital. Road games will typically be streamed on the opponents website, though conference road games could also appear on ESPN3 or AAC Digital.

Roster

Schedule and results

|-
!colspan=12 style="background:#084C9E; color:#CFB53B;"| Exhibition

|-
!colspan=12 style="background:#CFB53B; color:#084C9E;"| Regular Season

|-
!colspan=12 style="background:#084C9E;"| 2015 AAC Tournament

|-
!colspan=12 style="background:#084C9E;"| WNIT

See also
 2014–15 Tulsa Golden Hurricane men's basketball team

References

Tulsa
Tulsa Golden Hurricane women's basketball seasons
2015 Women's National Invitation Tournament participants